Mangu Station is a station on the Gyeongui-Jungang Line, and the Gyeongchun Line since 21 December 2010. The station was Seoul's main distribution center of charcoal briquettes in the 1950s and 1960s, extracted and manufactured in southern Gangwon province. These briquettes were widely used by people to weather harsh winters when Korea was a developing country and recovering from the Korean War. It is a station that still predominantly handles freight trains. It is very close to an E-Mart and Costco stores.

Although it is located close to the Sangbong Bus Terminal and Sangbong Station, it has yet to fulfill its potential as a transportation hub. With the electrification and twin-tracking of the Gyeongchun Line, this station is the newly designated western terminus station (however, the Gyeongchun Line operates about 1 km west further till its de facto terminus, Sangbong).

External links
 Station information from Korail

Seoul Metropolitan Subway stations
Metro stations in Jungnang District
Railway stations opened in 1940